This is a list of bioinformatics companies that have articles at Wikipedia:

 Applied Maths provides the software suite BioNumerics
 Astrid Research
 BIOBASE
 BioBam Bioinformatics creator of Blast2GO 
 Biomax Informatics AG bioinformatics services.
 Biovia (formerly Accelrys).
 Chemical Computing Group MOE software for structural modelling
 CLC Bio Bioinformatics workbenches.
 DNASTAR provides software for sequence editing and annotation, primer and clone design; sequence assembly & analysis; and protein sequence analysis and structure prediction.
 Gene Codes Corporation
 Genedata software for data analysis and storage.
 GeneTalk web-based services.
 GenoCAD 
 Genomatix
 Genostar provides streamlined bioinformatics.
 Inte:Ligand
 Integromics
 Invitae
 Invitrogen creator of Vector NTI
 Leidos Biomedical Research Inc. formerly SAIC. Services are aimed at the Federal Government market.
 MacVector
 QIAGEN Silicon Valley (formerly Ingenuity Systems)
 Qlucore
 Phalanx Biotech Group
 SimBioSys created the eHITS software
 SRA International services aimed at the Federal Government market.
 Strand Life Sciences 
 TimeLogic offers DeCypher FPGA-accelerated BLAST, Smith-Waterman, HMMER and other sequence search tools.
Bioinformatics companies